Mie Schjøtt-Kristensen (born 14 May 1984) is a Danish badminton player. She started to playing badminton at aged six in Brylle club Funen. She moved to train in Copenhagen and join the national team in 2002. She was part of the Danish team that won the gold medals at the 2008, 2009 European Mixed Team Championships, and 2008 Women's Team Championships. She also won the bronze medal at the 2010 European Championships. In June 2011, she decided to quit from the national team.

Achievements

European Championships
Women's doubles

BWF Grand Prix 
The BWF Grand Prix has two level such as Grand Prix and Grand Prix Gold. It is a series of badminton tournaments, sanctioned by Badminton World Federation (BWF) since 2007.

Women's doubles

Mixed doubles

 BWF Grand Prix Gold tournament
 BWF Grand Prix tournament

BWF International Challenge/Series
Women's singles

Women's doubles

Mixed doubles

 BWF International Challenge tournament
 BWF International Series/European Circuit tournament

References

External links 

1984 births
Living people
Sportspeople from Odense
Danish female badminton players